Rho Coronae Borealis (ρ CrB, ρ Coronae Borealis) is a yellow dwarf star approximately 57 light-years away in the constellation of Corona Borealis. The star is thought to be similar to the Sun with nearly the same mass, radius, and luminosity. It is orbited by two known exoplanets.

Stellar properties 

Rho Coronae Borealis is a yellow main sequence star of the spectral type G0V. The star is thought to have 91 percent of the Sun's mass, along with 1.4 times its radius and 1.7 times its luminosity. It may only be 51 to 65 percent as enriched with elements heavier than hydrogen (based on its abundance of iron) and is likely somewhat older than the Sun at around ten billion years old.

The rotation period of Rho Coronae Borealis is approximately 20 days, even though at this age, stars are hypothesized to decouple their rotational evolution and magnetic activity.

Planetary system 

An extrasolar planet in a 39.8-day orbit around Rho Coronae Borealis was discovered in 1997 by observing the star's radial velocity variations. This detection method only gives a lower limit on the true mass of the companion. In 2001, preliminary Hipparcos astrometric satellite data indicated that the orbital inclination of the star's companion was 0.5°, nearly face-on, implying that its mass was as much as 115 times Jupiter's. A paper published in 2011 supported this claim using a new reduction of the astrometric data, with an updated mass value of 169.7 times Jupiter, with a 3σ confidence region 100.1 to 199.6 Jupiter masses. Such a massive body would be a dim red dwarf star, not a planet. In 2016, however, a paper was published that used interferometry to rule out any stellar companions to this star, in addition to detecting a second planetary companion in a 102-day orbit.

Searches for circumstellar material 

In October 1999, astronomers at the University of Arizona announced the existence of a circumstellar disk around the star. Follow-up observations with the Spitzer Space Telescope failed to detect any infrared excess at 24- or 70-micrometre wavelengths, which would be expected if a disk were present. No evidence for a disk was detected in observations with the Herschel Space Observatory either.

See also 

 51 Pegasi
 55 Cancri
 Kappa Coronae Borealis

References

External links 

 
 
 
 

Coronae Borealis, Rho
Corona Borealis
Coronae Borealis, 15
143761
078459
5968
G-type main-sequence stars
Solar analogs
9537
BD+33 2663
J16010264+3318124
Planetary systems with two confirmed planets